The 2016–17 Women's Regional Super50 was a 50-over women's cricket competition that took place in the West Indies. It took place in April 2017, with 6 teams taking part and all matches taking place in Saint Vincent and the Grenadines. Trinidad and Tobago won the tournament, beating Barbados in the final.

Competition format 
The six teams played in a round-robin, therefore playing five matches. Matches were played using a one day format with 50 overs per side. The top two teams in the group advanced to the final.

The group worked on a points system with positions being based on the total points. Points were awarded as follows:

Win: 4 points 
Tie: 2 points 
Loss: 0 points.
Abandoned/No Result: 2 points.

Points table

Source: CricketArchive

Final

Statistics

Most runs

Source: CricketArchive

Most wickets

Source: CricketArchive

References

Women's Super50 Cup
2017 in West Indian cricket
Domestic cricket competitions in 2016–17